Chromy (Polish) or Chromý (Czech) is a surname which means "lame" (unable to walk properly) in West Slavic languages. It is a cognate of Khromykh, a surname found in Russia and Ukraine. Notable people with the surname include:

 Adam Chromý (born 1988), Czech orienteering competitor
 Anna Chromý (1940–2021), Czech painter and sculptor
 Bronisław Chromy (1925–2017), Polish sculptor

See also
 

Czech-language surnames
Polish-language surnames